Lobianchia is a genus of lanternfishes found in the Atlantic Ocean.

The generic name was derived from Latin lobus ("lobe") and Greek αγχόνη (anchonē, "noose").

Species
There are currently two recognized species in this genus:
 Lobianchia dofleini (Zugmayer, 1911) (Dofleini's lanternfish)
 Lobianchia gemellarii (Cocco, 1838) (Cocco's lanternfish)

References

Myctophidae
Marine fish genera